Mohammed Al-Rabiei (Arabic: محمد الربيعي) (born 29 April 1990) is a Qatari footballer. He currently plays for Qatar .

External links

References

Qatari footballers
1990 births
Living people
Qatar SC players
Qatar Stars League players
Qatari Second Division players
Association football defenders